The 9th National Assembly of the Republic of Slovenia was established by decree of the President of the Republic, Borut Pahor, based on the  legislative election held on 24 April 2022.

The constituent session was held on 13 May 2022. Urška Klakočar Zupančič was elected President of the National Assembly.

History 
On 9 May 2022, the temporary heads of parliamentary groups of the parties of the new convocation met with the then President of the National Assembly, Igor Zorčič. The Freedom Movement was represented by Robert Golob, SDS by Danijel Krivec, New Slovenia by Jožef Horvat, Social Democrats  by Matjaž Han and Left Party by Miha Kordiš. They determined the seating order, whereby SDS, NSi and Left retained their seats, while GS and SD were placed in the middle of the hall. The Freedom Movement nominated Urška Klakočar Zupančič for the post of President of the National Assembly, while the remaining vice-presidential positions would go to SD, Left and SDS. Robert Golob said he wants women in these positions.The new coalition proposed Robert Pavšič, who was a member of the List of Marjan Šarec in the previous convocation, for the position of Secretary General of the National Assembly. The Slovenian Democratic Party and Nova Slovenija characterized the proposal as unacceptable, since this position must be occupied by a person with the appearance of impartiality and a more suitable education.

Constituing session 
The inaugural session of the new National Assembly took place on Friday, May 13, 2022. The President of the Republic, Borut Pahor, and the outgoing President of the National Assembly, Igor Zorčič, addressed the gathering, and the deputies confirmed their mandates. The meeting was chaired by the oldest MP - Miroslav Gregorič from the Freedom Movement party. At the founding session, the new leadership of the National Assembly was elected; Urška Klakočar Zupančič was elected president, and Meira Hot became vice president. In the SDS and NSi, immediately after the confirmation of the mandates of the deputies, they submitted about 30 draft laws to the parliamentary procedure, among others on RTV Slovenia and STA, as well as on the prosecution and the legal profession. On May 25, Nataša Sukič from the Left party was also elected to the position of vice-president of the National Assembly.

A week later, on May 20, 2022, deputies established new parliamentary groups. On May 24, the collegium of the President of the National Assembly distributed the positions in the working bodies (13 committees and eight commissions): Nine presidential positions went to the Freedom Movement, five to SDS, three to New Slovenia, two to SD and one to the Left, one presidential position, in the commission for national community, and it also belonged to one of the minority MPs.The Slovenian Democratic Party expressed its disapproval of the split due to the ratio of presidential seats between them and the Nova Slovenija party. According to the proportional calculation, SDS would have six presidential seats, and Nova Slovenia two. At the collegium meeting, NSi proposed a supplement, with which they obtained one additional position of president (in the commission for the control of public finances) and gave up one of the three vice-president positions. The Nova Slovenije amendment was accepted by the collegium, only the head of the SDS parliamentary group Jelka Godec opposed it, who pointed out the violation of the Rules of Procedure of the National Assembly of the Republic of Slovenia. Her party has therefore announced that they will not appoint their members to the presidential posts, nor will they nominate a candidate for the position of vice president of the National Assembly.

On Thursday, June 9, 2022, another extraordinary session of the DZ will take place, at which the mandates of substitute deputies will be confirmed, and the deputies will also vote on the third vice-president of the DZ in a secret ballot. The candidate for this position is Danijel Krivec from SDS.

Current composition 
This list consists of current members of the 9th National Assembly of Slovenia.

See also 

 Politics of Slovenia
 8th National Assembly of Slovenia

References 

2022 establishments
National Assembly of Slovenia
National Assembly (Slovenia)